The Center Theatre was a theater located at 1230 Sixth Avenue, the southeast corner of West 49th Street in Rockefeller Center in New York City. Seating 3,500, it was originally designed as a movie palace in 1932 and later achieved fame as a showcase for live musical ice-skating spectacles. It was demolished in 1954, the only building in the original Rockefeller Center complex to have been torn down.

History

The Center Theatre was originally called the RKO Roxy Theatre and built as part of the construction of Rockefeller Center. The RKO Roxy started construction in November 1931, and it opened December 29, 1932 with the RKO film The Animal Kingdom and a live stage show. It was intended as a smaller sister to the 6,000 seat Radio City Music Hall one block away, which at first did not show films. The smaller theater was named after producer Samuel L. Rothafel, aka "Roxy", who was engaged by Rockefeller Center to supervise the design and operation of the two theaters.  After the initial failure of the Music Hall in its first weeks, Rothafel suffered a heart attack and never returned to his new theaters. A successful lawsuit in 1933 by the owners of the original Roxy Theatre on Seventh Avenue, claiming ownership of the "Roxy" name, caused the new theater to be renamed the RKO Center.

The Center Theatre featured an elegant Art Deco design which was muted by comparison to the lavish Radio City Music Hall. The architect was Edward Durrell Stone and decor was by Eugene Schoen. The spare but striking design featured curved walls paneled in mahogany. It had a three-tiered metal chandelier weighing six tons, and a ceiling studded with circles decorated in half-relief with mythological figures. Three shallow mezzanines provided an unobstructed view of the stage. The large stage contained turn-screw lifts as did the orchestra pit. There was also a 34-rank Wurlitzer theatre organ with a single stained wood console at stage right similar to the Radio City Wurlitzer twin consoles which were finished in ebony. Betty Gould and Raymond Bohr were some of the organ's featured artists.

Originally operated by the RKO movie theater chain, the Center was soon overshadowed in the movie business by the hugely popular Music Hall. In 1934 it converted to presenting Broadway plays and musicals. Now called the Center Theatre, it offered The Great Waltz and a few other shows but the theater was too large to find lasting success in this venture either.

The last feature film to play at the theatre was Walt Disney's Pinocchio in 1940. 

Looking for a way to make the Center Theatre profitable, Rockefeller Center, inspired by the theatrical success of figure-skating champion Sonja Henie, converted it into a theater expressly designed for the presentation of musical ice shows. This venture was headed by G.S. Eyssell, executive manager of Rockefeller Center, and Arthur M. Wirtz, of Chicago.

For the surface, specially designed ice-making machinery was installed. The result was a permanent frozen stage surface that was ideal for skating. 

As an ice theater, the Center Theatre reopened on October 10, 1940 with the presentation of Sonja Henie's production, It Happens on Ice, first of the musical ice spectacles. This proved to be a popular new form of entertainment. The show was a huge success, attracting greater than 1.5 million people during its run. For the next several years the Center offered more ice spectacles produced by Henie and Wirtz, including: Stars on Ice, Hats Off to Ice, Icetime, and Howdy Mr. Ice. In addition, during this time the Center was the home for the spring season of the San Carlo Opera Company from 1944 to 1949.

The Center Theatre had never been able to become a consistently profitable venture for Rockefeller Center. In 1951, the theatre was leased by NBC and became a venue for live television broadcasts. Many early programs, including The Voice of Firestone and Your Show of Shows, were broadcast from the Center Theatre. Two years later, the United States Rubber Company indicated that it wanted to expand the U.S. Rubber Company Building above the Center Theatre, meaning that the theater had to be closed and demolished to make way for the extra office space.

After 21 years of operation, the Center Theatre was demolished in 1954 and replaced with a 19-story addition to the U.S. Rubber Company Building. The final production at the theatre was the New York-portion of the 1953 Academy Awards, when Audrey Hepburn won Best Actress for Roman Holiday. During the demolition process, the U.S. Rubber Building above it was put on temporary stilts, with the offices above the former theater still being occupied during the demolition process. Doors, lamps, and other furnishings were sold off to the Cherry Lane Theatre in the West Village. Bob Jones University purchased the stage lifts and turntables from the Center Theatre and reassembled them in its Rodeheaver Auditorium, where the mechanisms are still in use today.

References

Bibliography

External links

 The Center Theatre on Internet Broadway Database
 The Center Theatre on Cinema Treasures.com
 It Happens on Ice on Internet Broadway Database
 Roxy and Radio City Music Hall costume designs, circa 1930-1939, held by the Billy Rose Theatre Division, New York Public Library for the Performing Arts
 A Short and Fevered Rehearsal: The Story of Rodeheaver Auditorium (eventual home of the Center Theatre stage)

Buildings and structures demolished in 1954
Former theatres in Manhattan
Former Broadway theatres
Movie palaces
Ice shows
Rockefeller Center
Art Deco architecture in Manhattan
Demolished theatres in New York City
Demolished buildings and structures in Manhattan
Theatres completed in 1932
1932 establishments in New York City
1954 disestablishments in New York (state)